Aguilaria subochracea is a species of sea snailin the family Pseudomelatomidae. It is the only species in the genus Aguilaria.

Description
The length of the shell attains 39 mm, its diameter 11 mm.

The elongate, fusiform, turreted shell is very characteristically coloured. The reddish-ochre colour is uniform, except where the transverse lirations (5 in the penultimate whorl and about 22 in the body whorl) cross the ribs or plications (14 in the body whorl), where they are white and slightly nodulous. The suture is well defined by the sudden termination of the ribs. The shell contains 13 convex whorls that are set back at the top. The aperture has a flesh colour. It is ovate at the top and ends in a mediocre elongated and recurved siphonal canal. It measures about 3/7 of the total length. The outer lip is rather incrassate and sinuate in the excavation. The columella is twisted, callous and shows a small tubercle at the top.

Distribution
This species occurs in the "China seas" and off the Philippines and Vanuatu.

References

 Taylor J.D. & Wells F.E. (1994). A revision of the crassispirine gastropods from Hong Kong (Gastropoda: Turridae). In: B. Morton (ed.) The malacofauna of Hong Kong and southern China III . Proceedings of the Third International workshop on the malacofauna of Hong Kong and Southern China. 101–116
 Liu J.Y. [Ruiyu] (ed.). (2008). Checklist of marine biota of China seas. China Science Press. 1267 pp.
 Li B.Q., Kilburn R.N., & Li X.Z. (2010). Report on Crassispirinae Morrison, (Mollusca: Neogastropoda: Turridae) from the China Seas. Journal of Natural History. 44, 699–740

External links
 
 Bouchet, P.; Kantor, Y. I.; Sysoev, A.; Puillandre, N. (2011). A new operational classification of the Conoidea (Gastropoda). Journal of Molluscan Studies. 77(3): 273–308
 
 Specimen at MNHN, Paris

Pseudomelatomidae
Monotypic gastropod genera